Ryan McBride (15 December 1989 – 19 March 2017) was a footballer from Derry, Northern Ireland, who played as a defender for Derry City in the League of Ireland.

Career
After stints with Brandywell Harps in the Derry and District League, Institute and a trial with Gretna, McBride signed for Derry City in February 2010 and broke into the Derry side during the 2011 season. He made his debut for the senior squad against Drogheda on the first day of July 2011. Later that month he was called up to the League of Ireland XI side to take part in the 2011 Dublin Super Cup. When his two-year contract came to an end in 2013, he was offered a renewed contract by new Derry City manager Roddy Collins.

During the 2014 season he was nominated as the League of Ireland player of the week, after scoring two goals against Sligo Rovers to help gain a draw for Derry. In September 2014 he scored in the 2014 FAI Cup quarter-final against Drogheda.

During the 2015 season he became the team captain. Former Derry City skipper, Barry Molloy was quoted in the Derry Journal saying: 

In late 2015 multiple websites reported him as the "toughest man in football", after an unusual tackle, that saw him tackle two Cork players at the same time, ended up on YouTube.

In September 2015, he again scored in the FAI Cup quarter-final, scoring a header against Cork.

In November 2015, McBride become one of the first players to be re-signed by Kenny Shiels for the 2016 season. Speaking to the Derry Journal, manager  Kenny Shiels talked about McBride saying:

Death
McBride was found dead at his home near Brandywell Stadium on 19 March 2017. Derry City's rearranged match against Limerick, as well as all fixtures for the 2017 League of Ireland Cup first round scheduled for 21 March 2017, were postponed as a mark of respect to McBride. Following McBride's death, Derry renamed their Brandywell Stadium home to the Ryan McBride Brandywell Stadium.

Career statistics

Honours
Derry City
FAI Cup (1): 2012
League of Ireland Cup (1): 2011

References

External links
 Ryan McBride Derry City FC player profiles. Retrieved 27 March 2016.
 

1989 births
2017 deaths
League of Ireland players
Derry City F.C. players
Association football defenders
Association footballers from Northern Ireland
Sportspeople from Derry (city)